is a railway station on the Tōkaidō Main Line and the Tōkaidō Shinkansen in Hamamatsu, Shizuoka, Japan, operated by the Central Japan Railway Company (JR Central). The local Enshū Railway Line terminus of Shin-Hamamatsu Station is 3 minutes' walking distance away.

Lines
Hamamatsu Station is served by the Tōkaidō Main Line and the high-speed Tōkaidō Shinkansen from Tokyo. The station is 257.1 kilometers from Tokyo Station.

Station layout
Hamamatsu Station has two island platforms serving Tracks 1-4 for the Tōkaidō Shinkansen, which are connected by an underpass a central concourse. At the same level as the Shinkansen tracks are the two island platforms serving Tracks 5-8 of the Tōkaidō Main Line. The station building has automated ticket machines, TOICA automated turnstiles and a staffed "Midori no Madoguchi" ticket office.

Platforms

Adjacent stations

History

Hamamatsu Station was officially opened on September 1, 1888. The station building was rebuilt in 1926, but this burned down during the Bombing of Hamamatsu in World War II. The station was rebuilt in 1948. On October 1, 1964, the Tōkaidō Shinkansen began operations, serving Hamamatsu. Freight operations were relocated to the Nishi-Hamamatsu Freight Depot to the west in 1971. The station underwent a massive rebuilding program from the late 1970s, with the Tōkaidō Main Line tracks elevated in 1979 to the same level as the Tōkaidō Shinkansen tracks, and the "MayOne" shopping centre/new station building completed in 1981.

Station numbering was introduced to the section of the Tōkaidō Line operated JR Central in March 2018; Hamamatsu Station was assigned station number CA34.

See also
 List of railway stations in Japan

References

Yoshikawa, Fumio. Tokaido-sen 130-nen no ayumi. Grand-Prix Publishing (2002) .

External links

Station information (JR Central) 
Hamamatsu Station Area Map

Railway stations in Shizuoka Prefecture
Railway stations in Japan opened in 1888
Railway stations in Hamamatsu